Free Dem Boyz is the fourth mixtape by American rapper 42 Dugg. It was released  on May 21, 2021, by 4 Pockets Full (4PF), Collective Music Group (CMG) and Interscope Records. The mixtape features guest appearances from Roddy Ricch, Future, Lil Durk, Rylo Rodriguez, EST Gee, Fivio Foreign, and Rowdy Rebel. Executive produced by rappers and label heads Lil Baby and Yo Gotti, record producers who contribute to the mixtape consist of TayTayMadeIt, DJ Swift, Helluva, Einer Bankz, Section 8, AnttBeatz, TyyMachine, Carlo Anthony, 808Melo, Taz Taylor, Murda Beatz, Pooh Beatz, Flex OTB, and more. The title of the mixtape refers to pleading for 42 Dugg's friends and family who are currently incarcerated to be freed from jail or prison.

Background
The mixtape is a tribute to the people that 42 Dugg knows who are serving time in jail or prison and the known people that are dead. Every song from 'Free Dem Boyz' is a tribute to them, even the "uptempo songs". On the cover of the mixtape, names of his friends and family that were locked up at the time of the mixtape's are there, such as MD, Mery, Onte, Rico, Skeet, Nell, Dirt, Wild, KWE, and Dunk.

Release and promotion
On May 13, 2021, 42 Dugg revealed the cover art of the mixtape, which gave its title. He revealed the release date on May 17, 2021. The following day, he posted a list of the guest artists on the mixtape, while also putting a pre-order link on Apple Music with the complete track listing.

Singles
42 Dugg released the mixtape's lead single, "Free Merey", on August 21, 2020. "Free Woo" was released as the second single on November 6, 2020. He released the third single, "Free Me" on November 26, 2020. The fourth single, "4 Da Gang", a collaboration with fellow American rapper Roddy Ricch, was released on April 2, 2021. The fifth single, "Maybach", featuring fellow American rapper Future, was released along with the mixtape on May 21, 2021.

Commercial performance
During the chart week of May 29, 2021, Free Dem Boyz debuted at number eight on the Billboard 200, making 42 Dugg's highest-charting project.

Track listing

Personnel

Musicians
 42 Dugg – primary artist 
 Roddy Ricch – primary artist 
 Future – featured artist 
 Lil Durk – featured artist 
 Rylo Rodriguez – featured artist 
 EST Gee – featured artist 
 Fivio Foreign – featured artist 
 Rowdy Rebel – featured artist 
 Arabian McWilson – featured artist 
 Moneybagg Yo – featured artist 
 Nardo Wick – featured artist

Technical
 Khaya "Macxsn" Gilika – engineering , mixing , recording , studio personnel 
 Leo Goff – mixing , mastering , studio personnel 
 Helluva – engineering , studio personnel 
 Chris Dennis – engineering , studio personnel 
 Derek Ali – mixing , studio personnel 
 Chris Athens – mastering , studio personnel 
 Julien Suleiman – engineering , studio personnel 
 Ari Morris – mixing , studio personnel 
 Matthew "Mattazik Muzik" Robinson – engineering , studio personnel 
 Antt Beatz – mixing , recording , studio personnel 
 Logan Schmitz – assistant mixing , studio personnel

Charts

Weekly charts

Year-end charts

References

2021 mixtape albums
42 Dugg albums
Collective Music Group albums